Ovation Records was an American independent record label based in Glenview, Illinois. The label was founded in 1969 by Dick Schory, who had been on RCA Records with his Percussion Pops Orchestra and had helped create the Dynagroove process used by RCA.

The label was created to feature many different genres; the mid-1970s success of The Kendalls gave Ovation an image as a country music label, although it continued to record rock and pop.

In the early to mid 1970s most Ovation LPs were released in a 4-channel matrix quadraphonic format, which was also compatible with conventional 2-channel  stereo playback systems. The label initially used the EV or Stereo-4 matrix but later changed to QS Regular Matrix.

The Ovation Records product was acquired by global rights management company 43 North Broadway, LLC.

Artists
Sheila Andrews
Max D. Barnes
Steve Dahl and Teenage Radiation
Okie Duke
Cleveland Eaton
Family Brown
Mark Gaddis
Vern Gosdin
Hollins & Starr
Johnson & Drake
The Kendalls
Bonnie Koloc
Harvey Mandel
Joe Morello
Possum River
Rich Mountain Tower
Joe Sun
Tantrum
Robbin Thompson
Sonny Curtis (from 1970 to 1972)
Heaven & Earth
 Citizen
 Judas Priest
 Band of Thieves

References

American country music record labels
American independent record labels
Record labels established in 1969
Defunct companies based in Chicago